Klec, Kleč or KLEC may refer to:

Places
Kleč, Kočevje, a settlement in Kočevje, Slovenia
Kleč, Semič, a hamlet in Semič, Slovenia
Klec (Jindřichův Hradec District), a municipality and village in the Czech Republic

People
Ivo Klec, Slovak tennis player
Michal Klec, Slovak footballer

Radio stations 
KLEC (FM), a radio station (90.5 FM) licensed to serve Liberal, Kansas, United States
KOLL, a radio station (106.3 FM) licensed to serve Lonoke, Arkansas, United States, which held the call sign KLEC-FM from 2000 to 2004

Other uses
Korean Language Education Center (disambiguation)